The following is a list of events affecting Canadian television in 1963. Events listed include television show debuts, finales, cancellations, and channel launches, closures and rebrandings.

Events 
April 8 –
Coverage of the 1963 federal election airs on CBC and CTV.
CJSS becomes the first television station in Canada to become a rebroadcaster.
 May 10—The 1963 Canadian Film Awards.
 November 22—CBC Television breaks the news of the assassination of John F. Kennedy.
Debut of Hinterland Who's Who.

Debuts

Ending this year

Television shows

1950s
Country Canada (1954–2007)
CBC News Magazine (1952–1981)
Chez Hélène (1959–1973)
Circle 8 Ranch (1955–1978)
Don Messer's Jubilee (1957–1969)
The Friendly Giant (1958–1985)
Hockey Night in Canada (1952–present)
The National (1954–present)
Front Page Challenge (1957–1995)
Wayne and Shuster Show (1958–1989)

1960s
20/20 (1962-1967)
A Kin to Win (1961-1964)
CTV National News (1961–present)
Flashback (game show) (1962-1968)
Music Hop (1962–1972)
The Nature of Things (1960–present, scientific documentary series)
People in Conflict (1962–1970)
The Pierre Berton Show (1962-1973)
Razzle Dazzle (1961-1966)
Reach for the Top (1961–1985)
Scarlett Hill (1962-1964)
Singalong Jubilee (1961–1974)
Take 30 (1962–1983)
Take a Chance (1961-1965)
Telepoll (1961-1965)
To Tell the Truth (1962-1964)

TV movies

Television stations

Debuts

Closures

See also 
 1963 in Canada
 List of Canadian films

References